Orlin Levance Norris (born October 4, 1965) is an American former professional boxer who competed from 1986 to 2005. He held the WBA cruiserweight title from 1993 to 1995. As an amateur, he won the National Golden Gloves title. He is the brother of retired former champion Terry Norris.

Professional career

Heavyweight contender
Norris turned pro in 1986 as a heavyweight and became a highly ranked and much avoided contender. In 1988 he won the NABF heavyweight title with a decision over the towering Larry Alexander, and followed it up with more easy points wins over respected challengers Renaldo Snipes, Jesse Ferguson, and ex-world champion Greg Page (boxer).

Page had been considered as an opponent for Evander Holyfield; however, after defeating Page, the shot was not offered to Norris. In 1990 he was outboxed by crafty ex-world champion Tony Tubbs (a decision later changed to a no-decision after Tubbs tested positive for an illegal substance), and followed up that momentum killer with a further loss, an 8th-round TKO to hard hitting Bert Cooper, where Norris was decked in the 8th round and twisted his knee, unable to continue.

In 1990 Norris regained some ground by beating future world champion Oliver McCall by split decision, and in 1991 regained his NABF title with a first-round knockout of Lionel Washington. He defended the title against ex-world champion Tony Tucker; however, he lost on a controversial split decision, after it appeared Norris had outboxed his giant opponent rather easily.

Cruiserweight World Champion
After the Tucker performance, Norris struggled to find contenders who would risk fighting him, and was forced to move down a division, into the cruiserweights. Having won the USBA belt in that division, in 1993 Norris beat Marcelo Victor Figueroa to capture the vacant WBA cruiserweight title and went on to successfully defend the title five times, including two wins over Arthur Williams and a victory over Adolpho Washington (two future world champs). Norris also retained his WBA Cruiserweight title in Mexico with a crushing win over fellow American James Heath.

In 1995 the weight draining caught up with Norris, as a very sluggish, strange performance saw him lose his belt to Nate Miller via 8th-round KO in London, England. Norris was hospitalised after the fight although he checked himself out the following morning.

Return to heavyweight
In 1996 he moved back up to heavyweight and scored a revenge win over an aging Tony Tucker. However, a long legal battle with Don King saw him lose his WBA mandatory #1 challenger status and instead of a challenge to King-promoted champion Evander Holyfield, Norris was forced to fight 6'7" King-managed heavyweight Henry Akinwande in an eliminator. Akinwande stayed at long range and scraped a decision over Norris. Once again a heavyweight title fight escaped Norris.

In 1999 he travelled to the UK and demolished colourful prospect Pele Reid in one round, but Herbie Hide pulled out of a WBO title fight with Norris at the last minute.

Norris fought Mike Tyson in 1999. After the first round ended, Tyson knocked Norris down with a left hook and Norris injured his knee when he went down, although he walked back to his corner in a normal manner, showing no discomfort.  Norris said he was unable to continue the fight and the bout was ruled a no contest. After the fight, Norris received an MRI scan at the Valley Hospital Medical Center and was diagnosed with a dislocated kneecap. Nevada State Athletic Commission physician Dr. Flip Homansky confirmed that the scan "clearly shows the path his kneecap took" as he fell and then got back up, popping it back into place. Tyson accused Norris of throwing the match. Norris was an aging fighter by the time he came back in 2000, outscored by Andrew Golota, and in 2001 making little effort and collapsing in sixty seconds against Vitali Klitschko in Germany, and losing a 12-round decision to Brian Nielsen in Denmark for the IBO title.

In 2005, he scored a draw with former champion Vassiliy Jirov, injecting some life back into his career.

Professional boxing record

See also
List of world cruiserweight boxing champions

References

External links

|-

1965 births
Living people
American male boxers
African-American boxers
Sportspeople from Lubbock, Texas
Boxers from Texas
Heavyweight boxers
Cruiserweight boxers
World cruiserweight boxing champions
World Boxing Association champions
National Golden Gloves champions
21st-century African-American people
20th-century African-American sportspeople